A pusher aircraft is a type of aircraft using propellers placed behind the engines and may be classified according to engine/propeller location and drive as well as the lifting surfaces layout (conventional or 3 surface, canard, joined wing, tailless and rotorcraft),
Some aircraft have a Push-pull configuration with both tractor and pusher engines. The list includes these even if the pusher engine is just added to a conventional layout (engines inside the wings or above the wing for example).

Conventional and three surface layouts
The conventional layout of an aircraft has wings ahead of the empennage.

Direct drive

Prop ahead of tail

Between booms or frames
Abrams P-1 Explorer 1937, 1 built
Acapella 200 1982 homebuilt, 1 built 
AD Scout 1915 interceptor, 4 built
ADI Condor 1981 2 seat motorglider, unk no. built
AEA June Bug 1908 experimental, 1 built
AEA Silver Dart 1909, first flight in Canada, 1 built
Aero Dynamics Sparrow Hawk Mk.II 1984 2 seat homebuilt
AGO C.II 1915 reconnaissance biplane, 15 built
AHRLAC Holdings Ahrlac 2014 reconnaissance attack, 1 built
Airco DH.1 1915 biplane, 2 seat, 100 built, 
Airco DH.2 1915 biplane fighter, 453 built
Alliet-Larivière Allar 4, 1938 experimental 2 seat, 1 built 
Akaflieg Stuttgart FS-26 Moseppl 1970 1 seat powered sailplane, unk no. built
Akaflieg Stuttgart FS-28 Avispa 1972 2 seat transport, 1 built
Alaparma Baldo 1949 1 seat, ca.35 built
Anderson Greenwood AG-14 1950 2 seats, 6 built
Applebay Zia 1982 1 seat ultralight motorglider, 4 built
Avro 508 1915, 1 built
Baldwin Red Devil 1911 aerobatic biplane, 6 built
Blackburn Triplane 1917 fighter, 1 built
Breguet Bre.4 1914 2 seat military biplane, about 100 built
Breguet Bre.5 1915 2 seat military biplane, unk no. built
Breguet Bre.12 1916 2 seat military biplane, unk no. built
Bristol Boxkite 1910 trainer, 78 built
Cessna XMC 1971 research aircraft, 1 built
Cody British Army Aeroplane No 1 1908, 1 built
Cody Michelin Cup Biplane 1910, 1 built
Cody Circuit of Britain biplane 1911, 1 built
Cody V biplane 1912, 2 built
Cody VI biplane/floatplane 1913, 1 built
Curtiss No. 1 1909 Golden Flyer biplane, 1 built
Curtiss No. 2 1909 Reims racer biplane, 1 built
Curtiss Model D 1911 biplane, 1 seat
Curtiss Model E 1911 biplane floatplane, 17+ built
Curtiss Autoplane 1917 (hops only) roadable aircraft, 1 built
de Schelde Scheldemusch 1935 1 seat biplane trainer, 6 built
de Schelde S.21 fighter mockup, 1940 (unflown)
Edgley Optica 1979 ducted fan observation aircraft 21 built
Fane F.1/40 1941 observation monoplane, 1 built
Farman HF.20 1913 military biplane, unk no. built
Farman MF.7 1911 biplane, unk no. built
Farman MF.11 1913 biplane, unk no. built
Farman F.30 1915 military biplane, unk no. built
Farman F.40 1915 military biplane, unk no. built
Fokker F.25 Promotor 1946 transport, 20 built
Friedrichshafen FF.34 1916 patrol seaplane, 1 built
General Aircraft GAL.33 Cagnet 1939 trainer, 1 built
General Aircraft GAL.47 1940 observation, 1 built
Grahame-White Type X Charabanc 1913 transport, 1 built
Grahame-White Type XI 1914 reconnaissance biplane, 1 built
Grahame-White Type XV 1913 trainer, 135 built
Häfeli DH-1 1916 reconnaissance biplane, 6 built
Hanriot H.110 1933 fighter, 1 built
Henderson H.S.F.1 1929 transport, 1 built
Heston JC.6/AOP 1947 2 seat reconnaissance, 2 built
HFL Stratos 300 1996 1 seat ultralight motorglider
Howard Wright 1910 Biplane 1910, 7 built
NPP Aerorik Dingo 1997 multi-role amphibian (air cushion), 6 built
Otto C.I 1915 reconnaissance biplane, unk no. built
Pemberton-Billing P.B.25 1915 scout, 20 built
Port Victoria P.V.4 1917 floatplane, 1 built.
Potez 75 1953 reconnaissance, 1 built
Royal Aircraft Factory F.E.1 1910 biplane, 1 built
Royal Aircraft Factory F.E.2 1915 military biplane, 1939 built
Royal Aircraft Factory F.E.8 1915 biplane fighter, 295 built
Royal Aircraft Factory F.E.9 1917 2 seat fighter, 3 built
Royal Aircraft Factory N.E.1 1917 night fighter, 6 built
Saab 21 1943 fighter, 298 built
SAIMAN LB.2 1937 2 seat monoplane, 1 built
Savoia-Pomilio SP.3 1917 reconnaissance biplane ca.350 built
SCAL FB.30 Avion Bassou 1936 2 seat light aircraft, 2 built
SECAN Courlis 1946 transport, unk no. built
Short S.38 1912, 48 built
Short S.80 Nile Pusher Biplane Seaplane 1913, 1 built
Short S.81 1914, 1 built
SIAI-Marchetti FN.333 Riviera 1962 4 seat amphibian, 29 built
SNCASO SO.8000 Narval 1949 naval fighter, 2 built
Sopwith Bat Boat 1913, 6 built
Sopwith Gunbus 1914, 35 built (including floatplanes)
Stearman-Hammond Y-1 1934 safety airplane ca.20 built
Vickers F.B.5 1914, 224 built
Vickers F.B.12 1916 fighter, ca.22 built
Vickers F.B.26 Vampire 1917, 4 built
Vickers VIM 1920, 35 built
Voisin-Farman I 1907, 60 built
Voisin III 1914 bomber, ca.3200 built 
Voisin IV 
Voisin V 1915 bomber, about 350 built
Voisin VII 1916 reconnaissance biplane, about 100 built
Voisin VIII 1916 bomber, about 1,100 built
Voisin IX 1917 reconnaissance biplane, 1 built
Voisin X 1917 bomber, about 900 built
Vultee XP-54 1943 fighter, 2 built
Wight Pusher Seaplane 1914, 11 built
WNF Wn 16 1939, Austrian experimental aircraft

Coaxially on rear fuselage
Brditschka HB-3 1971 2 seat motorglider, unk no. built
Buselec 2, 2010 project, with electric motor
Gallaudet D-4 1918 seaplane, 2 built
Austria Krähe 1960 1 seat motorglider, unk no. built
Royal Aircraft Factory F.E.3/A.E.1 1913 armoured biplane, 1 built
Royal Aircraft Factory F.E.6, 1914, 1 built
RFB/Grumman American Fanliner 1973, 2 seats, 2 built
RFB Fantrainer 1977, 2 seats, 47 built
Rhein Flugzeugbau RW 3 Multoplan 1955 27 built
Rhein Flugzeugbau Sirius I 1969, 2 seats
Vickers Type 161 1931 fighter, 1 built

Nacelle above fuselage
3I Sky Arrow (now marketed by Magnaghi Aeronautica) 1982 maiden flight, ULM/LSA/GA tandem two-seater high wing, some 50 built.
AD Flying Boat, Supermarine Channel & Sea Eagle 1916 patrol and airline flying boat, 27 built. 
Aeromarine 40 1919 flying boat trainer, 50 built
Aeromarine 50 1919 transport flying boat, unk no. built
Aerosport Rail 1970 single seat ultralight, twin engine, 1 built
Aichi AB-4 1932 flying boat, 6 built
Aichi E10A 1934 reconnaissance flying boat, 15 built
Aichi E11A 1937 reconnaissance flying boat, 17 built
Airmax Sea Max 2005 2 seat biplane amphibian, unk no. built
Amiot 110-S 1931 patrol flying boat, 2 built
Benoist XIV 1913 transport flying boat, 2 built
Beriev MBR-2 1931 flying boat, 1365 built
Beriev MBR-7 1937 flying boat, unk no. built
Boeing B-1 1919 transport flying boat, 1 built
Boeing Model 204 Thunderbird 1929 flying boat, 7 built
Boeing-Canada A-213 Totem 1932 flying boat, 1 built
CAMS 30 1922 flying boat trainer, 31 built
CAMS 31 1922 flying boat fighter, 2 built
CAMS 37 1926 reconnaissance flying boat, 332 built
CAMS 38 1923 racing flying boat, 1 built
CAMS 46 1926 flying boat trainer, unk. no built
Canadian Vickers Vedette 1924 forestry patrol flying boat, 60 built
Canadian Vickers Vista 1927 1 seat monoplane flying boat, 1 built
CANT 7 1924 flying boat trainer, 34 built
CANT 10 1925 flying boat airliner, 18 built
CANT 18 1926 flying boat trainer, 29 built
CANT 25 1927 flying boat fighter, unk no. built
Curtiss Model F 1912 flying boat, 150+ built
Curtiss HS 1917 patrol flying boat, ca.1,178 built
Curtiss-Wright CA-1 1935 amphibious flying boat, 3 built
CZAW Mermaid 2005 2 seat amphibious biplane, unk no. built
Donnet-Denhaut flying boat 1915 patrol flying boat, ca. 1,085 built 
Dornier Do 12 1932 amphibian, 4 seats, 1 built
Dornier Do 18 1935 monoplane flying boat, 170 built
FBA Type A, B, C 1913 patrol flying boat, unk no. built
FBA Type H 1915 patrol flying boat, ~2000 built
FBA 17 1923 flying boat trainer, 300+ built
FBA 290 1931, amphibious flying boat trainer, 10 built
FBA 310 1930 amphibious flying boat transport, 9 built
Fizir AF-2 1931 amphibious flying boat trainer, 1 built 
Fokker B.I & III 1922 biplane reconnaissance flying boat, 2 built
Fokker F.11/B.IV 1928 monoplane transport flying boat, 7 built 
General Aviation PJ 1933 monoplane flying boat, 5 built
Grigorovich M-5 1915 patrol flying boat, ca.300 built
Grigorovich M-9 1916 patrol flying boat, ca.500 built
Grigorovich M-11 1916 fighter flying boat, ca.60 built
Grigorovich M-15 1917 patrol flying boat, unk no. built
Hansa-Brandenburg CC 1916 flying boat fighter, 73 built
Hansa-Brandenburg W.20 1918 U-boat flying boat, 3 built
Ikarus ŠM 1924 flying boat trainer, 42 built
Kawanishi E11K 1937 monoplane flying boat, 2 built
Lake Buccaneer 1959 amphibian, 4 seats, 1000+ built
Loening XSL 1931 submarine airplane, 1 built
Lohner E 1913, ca.40 built
Lohner L, R and S 1915, 100+ built
Loire 50 1933 training amphibian, 7 built
Loire 130 1934 reconnaissance flying boat, 125 built
Macchi L.2 1916, reconnaissance flying boat, 17 built
Macchi M.3 1916, reconnaissance flying boat, 200 built
Macchi M.5 1917, flying boat fighter, 244 built
Macchi M.7 1918 flying boat fighter, 100+ built
Macchi M.9 1918 flying boat bomber, 30 built
Macchi M.12 1918 flying boat bomber, ca.10 built
Macchi M.18 1920 flying boat, 90+ built
Macchi M.26 1924 flying boat fighter, 2 built 
Macchi M.41 1927 flying boat fighter, 42 built
Microleve Corsario 1988 ultralight amphibious homebuilt, unk no. built
Norman Thompson N.T.2B 1917 flying boat trainer, 100+ built
Norman Thompson N.T.4 1916 patrol flying boat, 72 built
Nikol A-2 1939 amphibious flying boat trainer, 1 built
Oeffag-Mickl G 1916 trimotor patrol flying boat, 12 built
Osprey Osprey 2 1973 2 seat homebuilt, unk no. built
Rohrbach Ro VII Robbe 1925 flying boat, 3 built
Rohrbach Ro X Romar 1928 flying boat, 3 built
Royal Aircraft Factory C.E.1 1918 flying boat, 2 built
Savoia-Marchetti S.57 1923 reconnaissance flying boat, 20 built
Savoia-Marchetti S.59 1925 reconnaissance flying boat, 240+ built
Savoia-Marchetti S.62 1926 reconnaissance flying boat, 175+ built
Savoia-Marchetti S.64 1928 distance record monoplane, 2 built
Savoia-Marchetti S.66 1931 airliner flying boat, 24 built
Savoia-Marchetti SM.78 1932 patrol flying boat, 49 built
Savoia-Marchetti SM.80bis 1933 transport amphibian, 1+ built
SCAN 20 1945 flying boat trainer, 24 built
SIAI S.9 1918 flying boat, unk no. built
SIAI S.12 1918 flying boat, 1 built
SIAI S.13 1919 reconnaissance flying boat, unk no. built
SIAI S.16 1919 flying boat, 100+ built
SIAI S.51 1922 racing flying boat, 1 built
SIAI S.67 1930 flying boat fighter, 3 built
SNCAO 30 1938 flying boat trainer, 2 built
Sperry Land and Sea Triplane 1918 patrol flying boat, 2 built
Supermarine Baby 1918 flying boat fighter, 1 built
Supermarine Commercial Amphibian 1920, 1 built
Supermarine Scarab 1923, 12 built
Supermarine Seal 1921, 4+ built
Supermarine Seagull 1921, 34 built
Supermarine Sea Eagle 1923, 3 built
Supermarine Sea Lion I & II 1919 racing flying boats, 2 built 
Supermarine Sheldrake 1927, 1 built
Supermarine Seagull/Walrus 1933 military flying boat, 740 built
Taylor Coot 1969 2 seat homebuilt amphibian, 70 built
Tellier T.3 and Tc.6 1917 patrol flying boat, ca.155 built
Tisserand Hydroplum and SMAN Pétrel 1983 homebuilt amphibian, ca.63 built
Tupolev MDR-2 1931 flying boat, 1 built
Vickers Viking, Vulture and Vanellus 1919 amphibious flying boats, 34 built.
Volmer VJ-21 Jaybird 1947 2 seat light aircraft, unk no. built 
Volmer VJ-22 Sportsman 1958 2 seat homebuilt amphibian, (not all are pushers), 100+ built
Vought VE-10 Batboat 1919 navy flying boat, 1 built

Below tail boom
Alpaero Sirius 1984 1 seat UL motorglider, 20 built
AmEagle American Eaglet 1975 ultralight motorglider, 12 built
Jean St-Germain Raz-Mut 1976 1 seat ultralight, 7 built
Nelson Dragonfly 1947 motorglider, 7 built
Taylor Tandem, unk no. built

Above tailboom, behind fuselage 
AAC SeaStar 1998 2 seat amphibious biplane, 91 built
Advanced Aeromarine Buccaneer 1988 2 seat amphibious biplane, unk no. built
Aerauto PL.5C 1949 1949 roadable aircraft, 1 built
Aérostructure Lutin 80 1983 1 seat ultralight motorglider, 2 built
Alpha J-5 Marco 1983 1 seat ultralight motorglider, unk no. built
British Aircraft Company Drone 1932 1 seat ultralight, 33 built
Curtiss-Wright Junior 1930 2 seat ultralight, 270 built
Curtiss-Wright CW-3 Duckling 1931 ultralight amphibious flying boat, 3 built
Fokker F.25 Promotor 1946 transport, 20 built
Funk Fk6 1985 1 seat ultralight motorglider, unk no. built
ICON Aircraft A5 2015 2 seat amphibious light sport, in production
Janowski Don Kichot/J-1 1970 1 seat homebuilt, unk no. built
Koolhoven F.K.30 Toerist 1927 2 seat monoplane, 1 built
Loening Model 23 Air Yacht 1921 transport flying boat, 16 built
Quad City Challenger 1983 2 seat ultralight, 3,000+ built
Republic RC-3 Seabee 1945 4 seat amphibian, 1,060 built
Siebel Si 201 1938 reconnaissance 2 built
Spencer Air Car 1970 4 seat homebuilt amphibian, 51 built
SZD-45 Ogar 1973 2 seat motorglider, 65 built
Taylor Bird 1980 2 seat homebuilt, unk no. built
Technoflug Piccolo 1989 1 seat ultralight motorglider, unk no. built
Vickers Aircraft Wave 2 seat carbon fiber amphibious light sport aircraft, in final development

Propeller behind the tail
Air Quest Nova 21 1992 2 seat homebuilt, unk no. built
Convair 111 Air Car 1945 roadable airplane, 1 built
Pénaud Planophore 1871 first aerodynamically stable fixed-wing aeroplane, rubber powered model, 1 built
Prescott Pusher 1985 4 seat homebuilt, ca.30 built

Lateral behind wing
AAC Angel, 1984 transport, 4 built
Airco DH.3 1916 bomber, 2 built
Avro 523 Pike 1916 bomber, 2 built
Baumann Brigadier 1947 transport, 2 built
Bell YFM-1 Airacuda 1937 interceptor, 13 built
Boeing GA-1 1920 bomber 10 built 
Convair B-36 Peacemaker 1946 bomber, 384 built
Curtiss H-1 America 1914 transatlantic biplane, 2 built
EM-11 Orka 2003 4 seat transport, 5 built
Friedrichshafen G.I 1915 bomber, 1 built
Friedrichshafen G.II 1916 bomber, 35 built
Friedrichshafen G.III 1917 bomber, 338 built
Gotha G.II 1916 bomber, 11 built
Gotha G.III 1916 bomber, 25 built
Gotha G.IV 1916 bomber, 230 built
Gotha G.V 1917 bomber, 205 built
LFG Roland G.I 1915 bomber, 1 built
Monsted-Vincent MV-1 Starflight 1948 airliner, 1 built
Nord 2100 Norazur 1947 transport, 1 built
OMA SUD Skycar 2007 transport, 1 built
Piaggio P.136 1948 amphibious transport, 63 built
Piaggio P.166 1957 transport, 145 built
Piaggio P.180 Avanti 1986 executive transport, 216+ built
Praga E-210 and E-211 1936 transport, 2 built
Royal Aircraft Factory F.E.4 1916 bomber, 2 built
Rumpler G.I, II and III 1915 bomber c.220 built 
Schutte-Lanz G.I 1915 bomber 1 built (behind wing)
Udet U 11 Kondor 1926 airliner, 1 built

Lateral nacelles
Custer Channel Wing 1942 experimental aircraft, 4 built
Embraer/FMA CBA 123 Vector 1990 airliner, 2 built
NAL Saras 2004 airliner, 2 built

Engines and props behind the pilot
Birdman Chinook 1982 ultralight homebuilt, 1100+ built
Ultralight trike or Flexwing
Spectrum Beaver 1983 ultralight homebuilt, 2080+ built
Paramotor or Powered paraglider
Powered parachute

Remote drive

Propeller ahead of tail

Within airframe
Fischer Fibo-2a 1954 1 seat motorglider, 1 built
Rhein Flugzeugbau RW 3 Multoplan 1955 RFB Fantrainer prototype, 27 built
Rhein-Flugzeugbau Sirius II 1972 2 seat motorglider, unk no. built
Megone biplane 1913 2 seat, 1 built
Neukom AN-20C 1983 1 seat ultralight homebuilt motorglider, 1 built

Behind wing

Burgess model I 1913 patrol floatplane, 1 built
Carden-Baynes Bee 1937 2 seat tourer, 1 built 
Eipper Quicksilver 1974 1 seat ultralight
Mann & Grimmer M.1 1915, 1 built
Raab Krähe 1958 1 seat motorglider, 30 built

Inside tail
Bede XBD-2/BD-3 1961 ducted fan boundary layer control aircraft, 1 built 
Mississippi State University XAZ-1 Marvelette 1962 experimental aircraft to test ideas XV-11 Marvel, 1 built 
Mississippi State University XV-11 Marvel 1965 boundary layer control test aircraft, 1 built

Behind tail
Aceair AERIKS 200 2002 2 seat kitplane, 1 built 
Acme Sierra 1948 1 seat experimental, 1 built
Aerocar Mini-IMP 1974  1 seat homebuilt, 250+ built
Aerocar IMP 4 seat, 1 built
AmEagle American Eaglet 1975 1 seat self-launching ultralight sailplane, 12 built
Antoinette I, 1906, 2 seats experimental, project 
Bede BD-5 1973 1 seat homebuilt, ca.150 built
Bede BD-12 1998 2 seat homebuilt, 1 built
Cirrus VK-30 1988 5 seat homebuilt, ca.13 built
Dornier Do 212 1942 experimental amphibian, 1 built
Douglas XB-42 Mixmaster 1944, bomber, 2 built
Douglas DC-8 (piston airliner) 1945, transport project, not built
Douglas Cloudster II 1947 transport, 1 built
Göppingen Gö 9 1941 experimental propulsion aircraft, 1 built
Grinvalds Orion 1981 4 seat homebuilt, ca.17 built
Grob GF 200 1991 transport, 1 built
HMPAC Puffin 1961 human powered aircraft, 2 built
HPA Toucan 1972 human powered aircraft, 1 built
Kasyanenko No. 5 1917 experimental biplane, 1 built
LearAvia Lear Fan 1981 transport, 3 built
LH Aviation LH-10 Ellipse 2007 2 seat homebuilt, 3 built
Lockheed Big Dipper 1945 transport, 1 built 
Myasishchev Mayal 1992 multi-purpose amphibian, 1 built
Miller JM-2 and Pushy Galore 1989 racer, 3 built
Planet Satellite 1949 4 seat transport, 1 built
Paulhan-Tatin Aéro-Torpille No.1 1911 monoplane, 1 built 
Pützer Bussard SR-57 1958  experimental 2 seater, 90 hp, 1 built 
Ryson STP-1 Swallow 1972 2 seat homebuilt motorglider, 1 built
Taylor Aerocar 1949 2 seat roadable aircraft, 6 built
Vmax Probe 1997 homebuilt racer, 1 built
Waco Aristocraft 1947 transport, 1 built

Propeller above fuselage
Schleicher ASH 26 1995 1 seat glider with retractable propeller, 234 built

Canard and tandem layouts
A canard is an aircraft with a smaller wing ahead of the main wing. A tandem layout has both front and rear wings of similar dimensions.

Direct drive
AASI Jetcruzer 1989 transport, 3 built
Ambrosini SS.2 & 3 1935 experimental aircraft, 2 built
Ambrosini SS.4 1939 prototype fighter, 1 built
Avtek 400 1984 transport, 1 built
Beechcraft Starship 1989 airliner, 53 built
Curtiss-Wright XP-55 Ascender 1943 prototype fighter, 3 built
E-Go Aeroplanes e-Go 2013 ultralight and light-sport aircraft, 1 built 
Fabre Hydravion 1910, first successful floatplane, 1 built
Gee Bee Model Q 1931 experimental, 1 built
Lockspeiser LDA-01 1971 experimental scale development aircraft, 1 built
Mikoyan-Gurevich MiG-8 Utka 1945 swept wing demonstrator prototype, 1 built
Miles M.35 Libellula 1942, experimental tandem wing carrier-based fighter, 1 built
Miles M.39B Libellula 1943, experimental (5/8 scale) tandem wing carrier-based bomber, 1 built  
OMAC Laser 300 1981, transport, 3 built
Paulhan biplane 1910, 3 built
Rutan Defiant 1978 4 seat homebuilt, 19 built
Rutan Long-EZ 1979 2 seat homebuilt, ca.800 built
Rutan VariEze 1975 2 seat homebuilt, ca.400 built
Rutan VariViggen 1972 homebuilt, ca.20 built
Santos-Dumont 14-bis 1906 first public controlled sustained flight, 1 built
Steve Wright Stagger-Ez 2003 modified Cozy homebuilt, 1 built
Voisin Canard 1911 biplane, 10+ built

Remote engine mounting
AeroVironment Gossamer Albatross 1979 human powered aircraft, 2 built
AeroVironment Gossamer Condor 1977 human powered aircraft won Kremer prize, 1 built
British Aerospace P.1233-1 Saba 1988 anti-helicopter and close air support attack aircraft, project 
 Deperdussin-de Feure model 2, 1910, experimental, 1 built 
Dickey E-Racer 1986 homebuilt, unk no. built
Kyūshū J7W, prototype fighter, 1 seat, 2130 hp, 1945, 2 built
Langley Aerodrome Number 5 1896 experimental model
Wright Flyer 1903 experimental airplane, first recognized powered, sustained flight, 1 built 
Wright Model A 1906 biplane, ca.60 built
Wright Model B 1910 biplane, ca.100 built

Tailless aircraft, flying wings and closed wing
Tailless aircraft lack a horizontal stabilizer, flying wings lack a distinct fuselage, with crew, engines, and payload contained within the wing structure.

Ben Brown SC ca.1932, experimental joined wing, 1 built
DINFIA IA 38 1960 transport, 1 built
Dunne D.4 1908, 1 built
Dunne D.5 1910, 1 built
Dunne D.6 & D.7 1911 monoplane, 2 built
Dunne D.8 1912, 5 built
 Facet Opal, 1988, 1 seat, experimental flying wing, 1 built 
Fauvel AV.45 1960 1 seat motor glider, unk no. built
Handley Page Manx 1943 experimental tailless aircraft, 1 built
Horten V 1938 powered testbed, 3 built
Kayaba Ku-4 1941 (not flown) research aircraft, 1 built
Ligeti Stratos 1985 1 seat homebuilt, 2 built
Lippisch Delta 1 1931, experimental tailless monoplane, 1 built
M.L. Aviation Utility 1953 inflatable wing, 4 built
Northrop N-1M 1940 experimental flying wing, 1 built
Northrop N-9M 1942 experimental flying wing, 4 built
Northrop XP-56 Black Bullet 1943 tailless fighter, 2 built
Northrop B-35 1946 bomber, 4 built
Pterodactyl Ascender 1979 1 seat ultralight, 1396 built
Rohr 2-175 1974 2 seat roadable aircraft, 1 built
Sud-Est SE-2100, prototype tourer, 2 seats, 140 hp, 1945 
Waterman Arrowbile 1937 roadable aircraft, 5 built
Waterman Arrowplane 1935 roadable aircraft, 1 built
Waterman Whatsit 1932 roadable aircraft, 1 built
Westland-Hill Pterodactyl series 1928, several built

Rotorcraft
Avian Gyroplane 1960, 2 seats, ca.6 built
Bensen autogyros
CarterCopter / Carter PAV
Fairey Jet Gyrodyne experimental gyrodyne
Wallis autogyros
McDonnell XV-1 experimental compound helicopter, 550 hp
Sikorsky X2 experimental compound helicopter
Sikorsky S-97 Raider experimental compound helicopter

Push-pull aircraft

Sides of fuselage
Bristol Braemar 1918 bomber, 2 built
Dornier Do K 1929 airliner, 3 built
Fokker F.32 1929 airliner, 7 built
Farman F.121 Jabiru 1923 airliner, 9 built
Farman F.220 1932 airliner and bomber, ca.80 built
Handley Page V/1500 1918 bomber, 63 built
Zeppelin-Staaken R.V 1917 bomber, 3 built

Above fuselage
Bartini DAR 1936 patrol flying boat, 1 built
Blériot 125 1931 airliner, 1 built
Boeing XPB 1925 patrol flying boat, 1 built
Bratu 220 1932 airliner, 1 built
Bristol Pullman 1920 airliner, 1 built
CAMS 33 1923 patrol flying boat, 21 built
CAMS 51 1926 flying boat, 3 built
CAMS 53 1928 transport flying boat, 30 built
CAMS 55 1928 patrol flying boat, 112 built
CAMS 58 1933 airliner flying boat, 4 built
Caproni Ca.73 1925 bomber unk. no. built
Caproni Ca.90 1929 bomber, 1 built
Chyetverikov ARK-3 1936 flying boat, 7 built
Comte AC-3 1930 bomber, 1 built
Curtiss NC 1918 patrol flying boat, 10 built
Dornier Do 18 1935 patrol flying boat, 170 built
Dornier Do 26 1939 push-pull flying boat, 6 built
Dornier Wal 1922 flying boat, ca.300 built
Dornier Do P 1930 bomber, 1 built
Dornier Do R Superwal 1926 airliner flying boat, 19 built
Dornier Do S 1930 flying boat, 1 built
Dornier X 1929 airliner flying boat, 3 built
Farman F.180 1927 airliner, 3 built
Felixstowe Porte Baby 1915 patrol flying boat, 11 built
Hinkler Ibis 1930 2 seat monoplane, 1 built
Johns Multiplane 1919 bomber, 1 built
Kawasaki Ka 87 1926 bomber, 28 built
Latécoère 21 1926 airliner flying boat, 7 built
Latécoère 23 1927 transport flying boat, 1 built
Latécoère 24 1927 mailplane flying boat, 1 built
Latécoère 32 1928 mailplane flying boat, 8 built
Latécoère 340 1930 airliner flying boat, 1 built
Latécoère 380 1930 flying boat, 5 built
Latécoère 500 1932 transport flying boat, 2 built
Latham 47 1928 patrol flying boat, 16 built
Lioré et Olivier LeO H-27 1933 mailplane flying boat 1 built
Loire 70 1933 patrol flying boat, 8 built
Macchi M.24 1924 flying boat, unk. no built
Naval Aircraft Factory TF 1920 fighter flying boat, 4 built
NVI F.K.33 1925 airliner, 1 built
Savoia-Marchetti S.55 1924 flying boat, 243+ built
Savoia-Marchetti S.63 1927 flying boat, 1 built
SIAI S.22 1921 racing flying boat, 1 built
Sikorsky XP2S 1932 patrol flying boat, 1 built
Tupolev ANT-16 1933 bomber 1 built
Tupolev ANT-20 1934 transport, 2 built
Tupolev MTB-1 1934 patrol flying boat, 25 built

Extremities
Aero Design DG-1 1977 push-pull racer, 1 built
Caproni Ca.60 1921 airliner flying boat, 1 built
Dornier Do 335 1943 push-pull fighter, 38 built
Moynet Jupiter 1963 push-pull transport, 2 built
Rutan Defiant 1978 transport, 19+ built
Rutan Voyager 1984 endurance record aircraft, 1 built
Star Kraft SK-700 1994 push-pull transport,

On nose and between booms
Adam A500 2002 push-pull transport, 7 built
Bellanca TES distance record aircraft, 1 built
Canaero Toucan 1986 ultralight, 16+ built
Cessna Skymaster 1963 push-pull transport, 2993 built
Fokker D.XXIII 1939 fighter, 1 built
Marton X/V (RMI-8) 1944 (unflown) fighter, 1 destroyed before completion
Moskalyev SAM-13 1940 (unflown) push-pull fighter, 0 built 
Schweizer RU-38 Twin Condor 1995 push-pull reconnaissance aircraft, 5 built
Savoia-Marchetti S.65 1929 racing floatplane 1 built
Siemens-Schuckert DDr.I 1917 fighter, 1 built
Thomas-Morse MB-4 1920 mailplane, 2+ built

On wings and between booms
AD Seaplane Type 1000 1916 bomber, 1 built
Anatra DE 1916 bomber, 1 built
Caproni Ca.1 1914 bomber, 162 built
Caproni Ca.2 1915 bomber, 9 built
Caproni Ca.3 1916 bomber, ca.300 built
Caproni Ca.4 1917 triplane bomber, 44-53 built
Caproni Ca.5 1917 bomber, 662 built
Gotha G.VI 1918 bomber, 2 built
Grahame-White Ganymede 1919 bomber/airliner, 1 built

See also
Push-pull configuration
Tractor configuration
Pusher configuration
List of pusher aircraft by configuration and date

References

Notes

Citations

Bibliography

Aircraft configurations